Prince of Tarnovo is the title held by the first-born son of the Bulgarian monarch. This title is held only by the heir to the throne.

Tarnovo (Veliko Tarnovo)  was an old Bulgarian capital and the strongest Bulgarian fortification of the Middle Ages between the 12th and 14th century and the most important political, economic, cultural and religious centre of the empire. In the 14th century as the Byzantine Empire weakened Tarnovo claimed to be the Third Rome based on its pre-eminent cultural influence in the Balkans and the Slavic Orthodox world.

In 1393 after vigorous resistance to a 3-month siege Turnovo was seized and the whole Bulgarian Tsardom was destroyed by the invading Ottoman Empire. The Bulgarian tsar Ivan Shishman moved his residence to the castle of Nikopol but took the title Prince of Tarnovo (Lord of Tarnovo, Gospodin Tarnovski).

In 1593 a Bulgarian noble and a descendant of the medieval Shishman dynasty, Theodore Ballina of Nikopol took the  title 'Prince of Tarnovo'. He was the leader of the First Tarnovo Uprising against the Ottoman Empire. In 1686 Rostislav Stratimirovic, another descendant of the dynasty and the leader of the Second Tarnovo Uprising, also took the title. During the Third Tarnovo Uprising in 1835, the title was taken by the leader of the uprising, Velcho Atanasov.

After his abdication from the Bulgarian throne, Prince Alexander Batenberg claimed the title Prince of Tarnovo and used it until his death.

In  1894 the first son of Ferdinand I of Bulgaria, Boris was given the old title 'Prince of Tarnovo' as a title for the Crown Prince, the heir apparent to the Bulgarian throne. The use of the title was continued by the royal family after the abolition of the monarchy in 1946. The wife of a Prince of Tarnovo is also titled Princess of Tarnovo (Knyagina Tarnovska). As of 2015, the current Prince of Tarnovo is Prince Boris, son of Prince Kardam.

List
People who have held the title Prince of Tarnovo:

Held in pretense
Since the monarchy's abolition, these are the people who have held the title Prince of Tarnovo in pretense:

References

Bulgarian monarchs
Turnovo
Heirs to the throne